Logan County Airport  is a public use airport located 2.2 nautical miles (4 km) northeast of the central business district of Lincoln, a city in Logan County, Illinois, United States. It is owned by the Logan County Board. The airport is also the site of the National Weather Service Central Illinois (Central Illinois Forecast Office).

Although most U.S. airports use the same three-letter location identifier for the FAA and IATA, this airport is assigned AAA by the FAA but has no designation from the IATA (which assigned AAA to Anaa Airport in Anaa, French Polynesia).

Facilities and aircraft 
It has two runways: 3/21 with an asphalt pavement measuring 3,999 x 75 ft (1,219 x 23 m) and 14/32 with a turf surface measuring 3,003 x 135 ft (915 x 41 m).

The airport has an FBO offering food and restrooms.

For the 12-month period ending August 31, 2019, the airport had 7,000 aircraft operations, an average of 19 per day: 80% general aviation, 19% air taxi and 1% military. At that time there were 13 aircraft based at this airport: 13 single-engine and 1 multi-engine airplane.

See also 
 List of airports in Illinois

References

External links 
 Heritage in Flight Museum at Logan County Airport
 Aerial photo as of 19 April 1998 from USGS The National Map
 

Airports in Illinois
Buildings and structures in Logan County, Illinois